KZTQ (1230 kHz) is a commercial AM radio station licensed to Reno, Nevada. The station is owned by Americom Limited Partnership. The station airs an alternative rock format known as "96.1 The Zone", after its translator in Reno on 96.1 FM.

The station's studios are located on Matley Lane in East Reno, and its transmitter is located near Veterans Parkway in Reno, just south of the Truckee River and the Sparks city limits.

History
The station signed on the air in 1947 with 250 watts using call sign KWRN. It was initially owned by Reno Newspapers, Incorporated and broadcast on 1490 kHz with 250 W power. This station was acquired by Kenyon Brown in 1950; Brown moved it to 1230 kHz two years later. Upon Radioreno's acquisition of KWRN in 1957, KWRN became KDOT, and on August 14, 1963, the station became KCBN, returning to the air October 30 of that year after being silent for nearly a year. The KCBN calls remained in place for most of the next 50 years.

The station announced as of March 18, 2013, it would switch from progressive talk to urban contemporary, branded as "Swag 104.9" and changed call letters to KSGG.

On March 24, 2014, KSGG changed its format to sports, with programming from Yahoo! Sports Radio (now SB Nation Radio).

On March 24, 2015, KSGG flipped to a country format as "96.9 the Rodeo", with an FM translator on 96.9 MHz, with a focus on 1990s country songs.

On October 1, 2016 KSGG changed their format to classic hip hop, branded as "Power 96.9 & 1230".

On March 15, 2018 KSGG swapped call signs with sister station KBZZ.

KBZZ was the former Reno affiliate of the San Francisco Giants Radio Network. Station ownership made the decision to discontinue Giants broadcasts beginning with the 2019 season.
On September 13, 2019, KBZZ and KZTQ exchanged call letters, formats, and associated translators: Bob FM and the KZTQ call letters moved to 1230 AM but kept its 96.1 and 96.9 FM translators, while 92.5 FM (nominally a repeater of KRNO HD2) flipped to sports talk as "92.5 The Game", also heard on 1270 AM, which regained the KBZZ call letters.

On February 10, 2023 KZTQ changed their format from adult hits to alternative rock, branded as "96.1 The Zone".

FM Translator
The 96.1 in the KZTQ branding originates with the FM translator frequency.

Previous logo

References

External links
FCC History Cards for KZTQ

ZTQ (AM)
Radio stations established in 1947
1947 establishments in Nevada
Variety radio stations in the United States
Bob FM stations